The 1999–2000 KNVB Cup was the 82nd edition of the tournament, at the time known as the Amstel Cup for sponsorship reasons. The competition started on 31 July 1999 and the final was played on 21 May 2000. Roda JC beat NEC 2–0 and received the cup for the second time. A total of 86 clubs participated.

Teams
 All 18 participants of the Eredivisie 1999–2000: six teams entered in the round of 16 of the knock-out stage; one team entered in the first round of the knock-out stage and the rest of the teams entered in the group stage.
 All 18 participants of the Eerste Divisie 1999–2000
 48 teams from lower (amateur) leagues
 Two youth teams

Group stage
The matches were played between July 31 and August 31, 1999. 79 clubs participated, 39 of which advanced to the next round.

E Eredivisie; 1 Eerste Divisie; A Amateur teams

Knock-out Stage

First round
The matches of the first round were played on September 22 and 23, 1999. sc Heerenveen entered the tournament this round, during the group stage they were still active in the Intertoto Cup.

E one Eredivisie entrant

Second round
The matches of the second round were played on October 28 and 30, 1999.

Round of 16
The matches of the round of 16 were played on January 27, 28 and 30, 2000. The Eredivisie teams that had been playing in European competitions after qualification last season, entered the tournament this round.

E six Eredivisie entrants

Quarter finals
The quarter finals were played on February 16 and 17, 2000.

Semi-finals
The semi-finals were played on April 11 and 12, 2000.

Final

Roda JC would play in the UEFA Cup.

See also
Eredivisie 1999–2000
Eerste Divisie 1999–2000

References

External links
 Results by Ronald Zwiers  

1999-2000
1999–2000 domestic association football cups
1999–2000 in Dutch football